The Sikorsky S-43 (sometimes referred to as the Baby Clipper) was a 1930s American twin-engine amphibious flying boat monoplane produced by Sikorsky Aircraft.

Design and development

The S-43 first flew in 1935, and was a smaller version of the Sikorsky S-42 "Clipper". It accommodated between 18 and 25 passengers, with a separate forward cockpit for the two crew. The S-43 was known as the "Baby Clipper" in airline service.

Approximately 53 S-43s were built, including examples of the twin-tailed S-43B.

Operational history

The S-43 was used primarily by Pan American World Airways for flights to Cuba and within Latin America. Inter-Island Airways of Hawaii (Inter-Island changed its name to Hawaiian Airlines in 1941) was the launch customer for the S-43. Inter-Island operated four S-43's to ferry Pan Am Clipper passengers and local residents from Honolulu throughout the Hawaiian Islands. Inter-Island sold its only twin-tail version to KLM. One aircraft was purchased by Norwegian airline Det Norske Luftfartselskap. Panair do Brasil operated seven aircraft. Five S-43s were used between 1937 and 1945 by the French company Aéromaritime on a colonial airway between Dakar (Senegal) and Pointe-Noire (Congo). Reeve Aleutian Airways owned two S-43s during the 1950s, one operational (N53294 purchased 1948 and trade for G-21 in 1957) and one for spares (fuselage at Alaska Aviation Heritage Museum). Another S-43 was operated in Alaska with an unknown operator, wrecked at Chignik, AK, 1950s.

The U.S. Army Air Corps acquired five aircraft in 1937 under the designation OA-8 for transport of freight and passengers. The U.S. Navy purchased 17 aircraft between 1937 and 1939 as the JRS-1, two of which served with the U.S. Marine Corps. One JRS survived by the end of 1941.

The Chilean Air Force (FACH) (formerly known as Fuerza Aérea Nacional (FAN)) in 1936 bought 2 S-43: No. 1 named "Magallanes" and the No.2 named "Chiloé", because that aircraft was going to use in the Línea Aérea Experimental Puerto Montt-Magallanes (Experimental Air Line from Puerto Montt to Magallanes) flying through the Patagonian fjords. 

Two aircraft went to private owners: William Kissam Vanderbilt II and Howard Hughes.

Surviving aircraft

Hughes' S-43 N440 was the last example to fly. It is now owned by Kermit Weeks and was at the Fantasy of Flight Museum restoration facility, in Polk City, Florida awaiting reassembly and restoration.

The Smithsonian National Air & Space Museum's Steven F. Udvar-Hazy Center in Virginia has now put a Sikorsky JRS-1 on display. This aircraft was on duty at Pearl Harbor on December 7th, 1941.

Accidents and incidents
June 2, 1937 The Chilean Air Force S-43 (No. 2) capsized off Ancud, Chile, killing all nine on board.
August 2, 1937 A Pan American-Grace Airways (Panagra) S-43B (NC15065) crashed in the vicinity of Coco Solo in the Panama Canal Zone; all 14 on board died. The plane spiraled into the water at approximately 90 mph and was destroyed by an immediate explosion and fire. Most probable cause of the crash was failure of one or both of the engines due to a faulty gasoline system and/or sudden and severe rain, as the pilot indicated losing altitude two times in the three minutes prior to the crash.
August 8, 1937 A China National Aviation Corporation (CNAC) S-43W (named Chekiang) ditched at Chilang Point, Bias Bay, China, killing three of four crew; all seven passengers survived. The flying boat was forced to ditch due to bad weather. High waves broke one wing off; the eight survivors clung to the other wing until rescued.
April 25, 1938 Pan Am Flight 105, an S-43B (NC16932) stalled and crashed on landing off Kingston due to engine failure; all 18 passengers and crew survived, but the aircraft was written off.
August 13, 1939 A Pan Am S-43 (NC16933) crashed into Guanabara Bay off Rio de Janeiro due to loss of control following engine failure, killing 14 of 16 on board.
May 17, 1943 Hughes crashed his S-43 into Lake Mead, killing CAA inspector Ceco Cline and Hughes employee Richard Felt. The aircraft was later raised and restored to flying condition.
August 3, 1945 Pan Am Flight 216, an S-43 (NC15066), crashed on landing at Fort de France Hydrobase due to weather and pilot error, killing four of 14 on board.
January 3, 1947 A Panair do Brasil S-43B (PP-PBN) crashed in the Amazon River at São Paulo de Olivenca, killing 11 of 14 on board.

Specifications (Sikorsky S-43)

See also

References

Citations

Bibliography

External links

 Video - Howard Hughes Sikorsky S-43
 Design and Construction Details of the New Sikorsky S-43 Amphibian – Aero Digest

S-043
1930s United States airliners
Flying boats
Amphibious aircraft
Parasol-wing aircraft
Pan Am
Aircraft first flown in 1935
Twin piston-engined tractor aircraft